The Napa Valley Wine Train is a privately operated excursion train that runs between Napa and St. Helena, California.  Much of the rail line parallels State Route 29 after leaving the City of Napa and passes the towns of Yountville, Rutherford and Oakville.  The route passes by many of the region's vineyards and wineries located in Napa County.

The Wine Train is operated by the Napa Valley Railroad (reporting mark NVRR).  Some of the NVRR equipment is marked NVR.

History

Early years
The railroad's track is part of what was originally the Napa Valley Railroad founded by early California pioneer Samuel Brannan in 1864.  Brannan established it to bring tourists to the resort town of Calistoga, California which he also founded.  The railroad's  of track ran from Calistoga to Vallejo, California where it connected with San Francisco Bay Area ferry boat service.  California Pacific Railroad Extension Company purchased the Napa Valley Railroad Company at a foreclosure sale on June 9, 1869. Later that same year on December 23, the railroad was renamed the California Pacific Railroad. The track was leased to Southern Pacific Railroad on April 1, 1885 and was soon connected to their main line in Suisun, California.  California Pacific Railroad was acquired by Southern Pacific on April 14, 1898. The line was extended to Benicia, California in 1904. The electric interurban railroad San Francisco, Napa and Calistoga Railway was built parallel to the NVRR and opened in 1905 until the 1930s. The NVRR track was utilized by Southern Pacific as a freight branch line for the following 58 years until 1987 when the railroad petitioned for abandonment.

Birth of a new railroad
The NVRR operating company was formed in 1987 by local entrepreneurs and headed by Vincent DeDomenico. DeDomenico was a veteran of more than 50 years in the food business and was formerly the president of Golden Grain, a company founded by his father and famous for its Rice-A-Roni. DeDomenico purchased the Ghirardelli Chocolate Company in 1964 and sold both it and Golden Grain to the Quaker Oats Company in 1986.  The NVRR acquired the right of way for $2.5 million after Southern Pacific notified the Interstate Commerce Commission of its intent to abandon the line in 1985.

The new company's plans to create a tourist-oriented Wine Train were strongly opposed by local community activists and several city governments.  Some people disliked the noise and pollution of an active passenger train line in their midst, while others felt that the train would attract even more visitors to the Napa Valley, which they saw as already over-saturated with tourists.  The project's opponents persuaded the state Public Utilities Commission (PUC) to order the company to comply with the rigorous requirements of the California Environmental Quality Act (CEQA).  However, in a 4-3 decision handed down on March 19, 1990, the Supreme Court of California held that the PUC had no jurisdiction to require CEQA certification because the train fell under the CEQA exemption for "the institution or increase of passenger or commuter service on rail lines already in use."

The gap in actual usage during the prolonged transition from Southern Pacific freight use to the proposed Wine Train service was not enough to take the line out of use, although the many years of deferred maintenance necessitated the investment of approximately $20 million to rehabilitate the line before trains could be safely operated on it.  The rail line connects to the Union Pacific Railroad and California Northern Railroad and has hosted special trains from Amtrak as well as private excursion trains.

Operations
The Napa Valley Wine Train has been in operation since September 16, 1989, and has now carried more than two million passengers.  This original train has a capacity of 320 passengers and typically makes two runs a day. The train is normally pulled by two of the four late-1950s era Alco FPA-4 engines in the company's inventory.  These engines were originally built by Montreal Locomotive Works and first owned by Canadian National Railway and later by Via Rail.  Two of the engines were modified by the railroad to run cleaner on a combination of natural gas and diesel fuel. One was dual fuel (NVR 70), and the other was 100% CNG (Compressed Natural Gas) (NVR 73).  Presently, #70 has been converted back to 100% diesel, while the #73 remains 100% CNG.

In June 2009, the St. Helena City Council voted to allow the Wine Train passengers to disembark in St. Helena on a trial basis on the first Friday of the month (May–October).
 Following the death of Vincent DeDomenico in October 2007,

  DeDomenico family members chose son-in-law Gregory McManus to step into the position of CEO. The DeDomenico family sold the Napa Valley Wine Train to Noble House Hotels & Resorts in partnership with Brooks Street in 2015. In 2017, Noble House Hotels & Resorts announced plans to build a 5-story, 148 room hotel on the railroad's property on McKinstry Street in downtown Napa.

During the 3-hour-long,  round-trip between Napa and St. Helena, passengers on the original train can choose to enjoy a meal prepared on-site. They can also sample several of the region's wines available at the wine bar located in one of the lounge cars.  The original train offers optional stops for tours and tastings at Castello di Amorosa in Calistoga, Grgich Hills Estate in Rutherford, Charles Krug in St. Helena, and Raymond Vineyards in St. Helena for an additional fee. The train hosts several special events throughout the year including murder mystery dinner theater, vintner's luncheons, and holiday excursions.

In June 2016, The Napa Valley Wine Train announced a new 36-seat Quattro Vino experience, a new culinary and wine tour that features stops at four of Napa Valley wineries – Robert Mondavi, Charles Krug, Merryvale and V. Sattui – and a four-course Napa Valley style meal curated by Napa Valley Wine Train's executive chef, Donald Young. Seattle-based Mallet, a design firm known for designing the first Ace Hotel and many Seattle restaurants, was commissioned for the railcar transformation.

In May 2017, the Napa Valley Wine Train announced several new experiences including the expansion of its inaugural Quattro Vino tour to include new tours – Legacy, Estate, and Collective – that offer culinary and wine stops at three Napa Valley wineries aboard renovated 1915 Pullman railcars. In addition to day-time experiences, the Napa Valley Wine Train introduced all-new Twilight Private Tours that allow guests to enjoy an evening train journey to Raymond Vineyards or Grgich Hills Estate.  Twilight Private Tours include appetizers, wine tastings, dessert, and coffee upon return, in addition to transportation to an evening dining experience at the wineries, open only to Napa Valley Wine Train guests.  The Quattro Vino Tour was the first new experience to debut under new ownership, and honors the Italian heritage of Napa Valley, from Robert and Peter Mondavi, to Dario Sattui.

The company announced in February 2018 that it would be leasing 5 passenger cars, a locomotive and power car from the Sierra Railroad Company while renovating the interior and exteriors of several cars in its fleet.

Equipment
The Napa Valley Wine Train currently runs nine cars on its passenger train consisting of lounge, observation and dining cars originally built by the Pullman Company in the early 1900s for the Northern Pacific Railroad.  These cars were later sold to Denver and Rio Grande Western Railroad in 1960 and used for the Ski Train between Denver, Colorado and Winter Park, Colorado before the NVRR purchased them in 1987.  The cars were extensively refurbished and modified by NVRR before the railroad placed them back into service.  Modifications included adding air conditioning and 4 inches of concrete to the car floors in order to stabilize the ride due to the train's low speed.  The interiors were remodeled using Honduran mahogany and plush fabrics.  The railroad added a Super Dome car to its fleet in 1997.  This car was originally built in 1952 for the Chicago, Milwaukee, St. Paul and Pacific Railroad and had logged more than a million miles for that railroad prior to being acquired by the NVRR.  After the railroad bought this car, the exterior was rebuilt by the Ringling Bros. and Barnum & Bailey Circus train repair yard in Palmetto, Florida while the interior was restored, updated, and customized by NVRR.

A modified box car containing a 400KVA generator was added to the consist in 2013 in order to maintain constant power to the train during the time that the locomotives are run around to the south end of the train, for the return trip from St. Helena.  The generator was placed inside a specially made, sound proof room—with a passageway on the opposite side, to allow passenger to walk the length of the car in comfort.  This boxcar remains the world's only walk-through generator car.  During the modification process, the roof of this car was lowered by two feet in order to preserve the view from the dome car and weight was added to the side of the car opposite from the generator in order to balance the load.

2015 controversy
On August 22, 2015, an 11-member book club group was removed from the train for laughing too loudly. The book club, Sisters on the Reading Edge, consisted of ten African-American women and one white woman, their ages ranging from 39 to 85. A reporter on the train expressed dismay that they were removed, and book club members described the experience as "humiliating."

A post from Napa Valley Wine Train on their Facebook page accused the group of "physical and verbal abuse towards other guests and staff." The post was subsequently removed. Two days later, Napa Valley Wine Train hired crisis communications expert Sam Singer to apologize for both the incident and the Facebook post which he described as "incorrect."

After the story was picked up by the local and national press, the Twitter hashtag #laughingwhileblack was used to express concern about racial bias, white privilege, and the actions of the wine train staff. Fallout from the incident caused two book club members to lose their jobs. The book club filed a lawsuit seeking $11 million in damages, and after private mediation, reached a settlement in April 2016 for an undisclosed sum.

Locomotives 

There are two locomotives on lease from outside owners:  #48 & #5076.

Plans
The NVRR track is currently utilized for limited daily scheduled passenger excursions of the Napa Valley Wine Train and occasional freight service. A July 2003 study  examined the feasibility of acquiring right of way between St. Helena and Calistoga and adding commuter service on the route. This study included consideration for connecting with other mass transit services beyond the Napa Valley and increasing freight service.

Developers of the proposed 3,200-unit townhome Napa Pipe project have proposed a private venture shuttle service that would utilize a portion of the NVRR line from the southern terminus of the line north to Redwood Road and Trancas Street. The proposed shuttle would continue south on Union Pacific Railroad-owned right of way to American Canyon, with trains leaving every 20 or 30 minutes. The developers have held preliminary discussions with NVRR as well as Union Pacific.

Backers of the proposal to add commuter service released a business plan in early 2012 revealing that the service would need to carry 1 to 1.5 million passengers per year in order to achieve a profit.
Members of the Napa County Transportation and Planning Agency have expressed some initial interest in the proposal.

See also 

List of California railroads
 List of heritage railroads in the United States
List of heritage railways
List of San Francisco Bay Area trains

References

External links 

 Napa Valley Wine Train official website
 Napa Valley Railroad Police Department
 The Antidote to Amtrak: The Napa Valley Wine Train
 Article about the early years of Napa railroad history
 Napa Valley wine route

Heritage railroads in California
Wineries in Napa Valley
Napa Valley
Napa, California
St. Helena, California
Yountville, California
Transportation in Napa County, California
California wine
Companies based in Napa County, California
Railway companies established in 1987
1987 establishments in California
Tourist attractions in Napa County, California